Albert Lewin (September 23, 1894 – May 9, 1968) was an American film director, producer, and screenwriter.

Personal life
Lewin was born in Brooklyn, New York and raised in Newark, New Jersey. He earned a master's degree at Harvard and taught English at the University of Missouri. During World War I, he served in the military and was afterwards appointed assistant national director of the American Jewish Relief Committee. He later became a drama and film critic for the Jewish Tribune until the early 1920s, when he went to Hollywood to become a reader for Samuel Goldwyn. Later he worked as a script clerk for directors King Vidor and Victor Sjöström before becoming a screenwriter at MGM in 1924.

Lewin was appointed head of the studio's script department and by the late 1920s was Irving Thalberg's personal assistant and closest associate. Nominally credited as an associate producer, he produced several of MGM's most important films of the 1930s. After Thalberg's death, he joined Paramount as a producer in 1937, where he remained until 1941. Notable producing credits during this period include True Confession (1937), Spawn of the North (1938), Zaza (1939) and So Ends Our Night (1941).

In 1942, Lewin began to direct. He made six films, writing all of them and producing several himself. As a director and writer, he showed literary and cultural aspirations in the selection and treatment of his themes. In 1966, Lewin published a novel, The Unaltered Cat.

Films
As director:
The Moon and Sixpence (1942)
The Picture of Dorian Gray (1945)
The Private Affairs of Bel Ami (1947)
Pandora and the Flying Dutchman (1951)
Saadia (1953)
The Living Idol (1957)

As screenwriter:
The Fate of a Flirt (1925)
Spring Fever (1927)

References
Botticelli in Hollywood: The Films of Albert Lewin by Susan Felleman (1997),

External links

Albert Lewin at Allmovie.

1894 births
1968 deaths
Film producers from New York (state)
American male screenwriters
Deaths from pneumonia in New York City
Harvard University alumni
Jewish American writers
People from Brooklyn
Writers from Newark, New Jersey
University of Missouri faculty
Film directors from New York City
Screenwriters from New York (state)
Screenwriters from New Jersey
Screenwriters from Missouri
Film producers from New Jersey
20th-century American male writers
20th-century American screenwriters
20th-century American Jews